Pierre Henri Martin Bokma (born 20 December 1955 in Paris) is a Dutch stage, television and film actor.

Bokma received his professional training at the Maastricht Academy of Dramatic Arts. In November 2007 he won an International Emmy Award for his role in the movie De uitverkorene (The Chosen One). He shared his award with the British actor Jim Broadbent.

Filmography 
The Assault (1986)
Evenings (1989)
Prospero's Books (1991)
Undercover Kitty (2001)
Snapshots (2002)
The Enclave (2002) (TV film)
Interview (2003)
Cloaca (2003)
 Dalziel and Pascoe (2006,  "Wrong Time, Wrong Place")
Waiter (2006)
Stricken (2009)
The Dark House (2009)
Sleeping Sickness (2011)
The Gang of Oss (2011)
Schneider vs. Bax (2015)
Cosmos Laundromat (2015)
Tonio (2016)
Rundfunk (2016)
The Blue Virgin (2018)
The Resistance Banker (2018)
 Patrick (2019)

References

External links

1955 births
Male actors from Paris
Dutch male film actors
Dutch male stage actors
Dutch male television actors
Living people
Golden Calf winners
Maastricht Academy of Dramatic Arts alumni
International Emmy Award for Best Actor winners
20th-century Dutch people